Darren "Daz" Sampson (born 28 November 1974) is a British professional football manager/scout, music producer and broadcaster. Sampson is known for his commercial dance music as part of several groups and his television appearances. He has had nine Top 30 UK singles.

In 2006, he represented the UK in the Eurovision Song Contest with "Teenage Life", a top 10 hit. He also established Sporting Riff Raff Records and has continued to perform and release recordings.

He has been involved as a professional football manager in the United Kingdom, continental Europe, in Asia and the USA. In May 2016, he became the North West of England scout for Scottish Championship team, Ayr United. He also has close links to Stockport County of the National League North.

In February 2020, he accepted the role as first team Manager of Phuentsholing United FC, a professional soccer team of the Bhutan Premier League. Sampson was due to undertake his duties at the start of April 2020; however with the outbreak of the COVID-19 pandemic, he remained in the UK.

Career before Eurovision
Sampson was born in Stockport, England, and went into radio broadcasting at 17 after an injury halted a potential career as a pro footballer. He spent several years working within commercial radio as well as Radio Luxembourg; from there he made the transition from playing music to making music.

Bus Stop
Sampson had his first chart success with the group Bus Stop (with Graham Turner, Mark Hall, and Nikki Reid (Lane)). Bus Stop had four UK hits, the most successful being "Kung Fu Fighting" featuring Carl Douglas, which sold 250,000 copies in the UK and over one million worldwide.

BBC Radio 1 DJ Chris Moyles responded to a letter from Sampson by championing his records on the station and inviting him to contribute comedy moments on his radio show. During this period, Sampson was almost a daily guest on the Radio 1 show, and from this came a deal with BMG for his act Blown Out.

Other Bus Stop hits included remakes of "You Ain't Seen Nothin' Yet" featuring Randy Bachman, "Jump" by Van Halen, and "Get It On" by T. Rex.

Many of the Bus Stop songs and remakes have been featured in the popular game series Dance Dance Revolution, including "Kung Fu Fighting", "Kick the Can", "Swing It", "One Two (Little Bitch)", "Na-Na", "Swing It", and "Long Train Runnin'". The band also made many appearances on the Dancemania series.

Fraud Squad
As the Bus Stop project was folding, in 2000, Daz Sampson formed a duo with JJ Mason. As Fraud Squad, the duo released "Together (We Can Make It)" which was popular in European night clubs, and was a hit single in France, spending seven weeks in the official French singles chart. JJ Mason made many remixes of Daz Sampson and Rikki and Daz songs, including "The Woah Song" and "Teenage Life".

Sampson & Mason
Daz Sampson and JJ Mason would return in 2006 with two releases under the name Sampson & Mason, "The Crown" and "The Feeling".

Rikki & Daz
In this period, Sampson formed Rikki & Daz with John Matthews (aka Ricardo Autobahn, hence "Rikki") of the Cuban Boys. Their 2002 single "Rhinestone Cowboy (Giddy Up Giddy Up)", featuring a new vocal from country music legend Glen Campbell, reached No. 12 in the UK. Another release as Rikki and Daz was the remake of DJ Bobo's hit "Chihuahua". credited to "Rikki & Daz Vs. JJ Mason Remix".

Barndance Boys / DJ Daz
The pair continued to work together under various names, including The Barndance Boys (for the minor hit single "Yippie I Oh") and DJ Daz ("The Woah Song", a remake of Baltimora's "Tarzan Boy"). Matthews later co-wrote Sampson's Eurovision song, "Teenage Life".

Uniting Nations
In 2004, Sampson returned to the Liverpool dance music scene, and he formed a partnership with producer Paul Keenan and under the name Uniting Nations. They released "Out of Touch", a remake of a Hall & Oates hit, which sold 150,000 copies of the single in the United Kingdom and became a European hit. Other big hits included "You And Me" (which reached No. 15 in the UK), proving yet another hit in Europe, and "Ai No Corrida", which reached No. 18, also in the UK. Smash Hits readers and T4 viewers voted Uniting Nations "Best Dance Act" at the last ever Poll Winners Party in 2005. Sampson also had three number one singles in Poland with Uniting Nations.

Eurovision Song Contest

Eurovision 2006
On 4 March 2006, Sampson won the BBC show Making Your Mind Up with the song "Teenage Life", written and produced with his long-time collaborator John Matthews. The accompanying dance routine involved four young women dressed as schoolgirls, dubbed The Sampsonites.

The song was a commercial success prior to Eurovision becoming a Top 10 hit for him on the UK Singles Chart with the single released on 14 May 2006 just prior to the contest. Sampson represented the UK in the Eurovision Song Contest on 20 May 2006 in Athens, but only 10 of the 39 eligible countries voted for Sampson and his total score was 25 points, placing him 19th out of the 24 acts.

Although he finished low down the rankings in the Eurovision Song Contest, he enjoyed success in the British charts. "Teenage Life" entered at number 13 in the UK Top 40. In the week following the contest, the publicity he had gained from this exposure helped his single to climb to number eight in the UK chart. Sampson claims that his performance may have raised the popularity of Eurovision in the UK, with the 2006 contest attracting half the UK TV audience, leading to the highest viewing figures in the UK in Eurovision history.

Eurovision 2007
After Eurovision, he said he would like to return to try for Eurovision Song Contest 2007. However, he later he announced that the BBC decided it was too soon for him to enter again, but he would be welcome in a few years time. Still he produced the song entitled "Do A Little Dance" but it did not make British Eurovision: Your Decision shortlist of songs for consideration.

Eurovision 2019
Sampson, along with British singer Nona, attempted to represent Belarus in the Eurovision Song Contest 2019 with a song entitled "Kinky Boots". It wasn't selected for the live final, which was won by ZENA.

Eurovision 2021
Sampson joined forces with the Belarusian singer Katya Ocean for an attempt to represent Belarus in the Eurovision Song Contest 2021 with a song Give you love. The song was not selected by the Belarusian broadcaster BTRC, and Belarus were later disqualified from the contest.

Other musical projects

Sporting Riff Raff Records
In 2006, Sampson established his own record company, Sporting Riff Raff Records with Ben O'Brien and Joe Taylor of Nuxx. The acts that recorded with the company, mainly hit pop/dance/disco bands were The Star Alliance, Spray, Mr. Fix It, Love Djs, Project 4.

Sampson & Mason
He collaborated with several artists and released in 2006 "The Crown" and "The Feeling" under the name Sampson & Mason in partnership with JJ Mason (of Fraud Squad).

Bandito
Daz Sampson and his long term writing partner John Matthews created in 2009 a dance act under the name Bandito after landing a record deal with Ministry of Sound's Hard2Beat Records. Bandito's debit solo "Rockin' At the Disco" featured vocals from Russell Graham of the boy band Pacific Avenue.

TV and radio
Sampson and John Matthews were to write the music score for a new Children's BBC CBBC animation show which was set to air summer 2013.

Since 2011, Sampson returned to a career in radio broadcasting in signing a deal with NBC/Universal where he stars in his own reality documentary show.

Football career

Sampson started his career as a footballer, spending his youth years at Manchester City's Junior Blues side, before being spotted by ex-Brighton manager Jimmy Melia whilst managing at Stockport. Following injury Sampson then quit the game as a player going on to manage and coach at semi-pro level.

Following musical success in Poland with Uniting Nations, Sampson took over the helm at a semi-professional club there and took them from bottom 3 to a Cup Final appearance in the 3rd tier of Polish football.

In 2012, Sampson came out of retirement and played games for Guam Shipyard, based in Guam, an island in the Pacific Ocean. He then went on to coach and lead the Shipyard to a cup final win, and regular top 3 finishes. After 2 seasons Sampson moved to Tampa in Florida to take charge of a new semi-professional team about to franchise into 4th tier of the MLS.

In 2015, Sampson returned to the UK and briefly took over a Step 6 Billinge FC in Cheshire, and then to Ashton United.

Following Sampson's stint in England, he moved back briefly to Guam to take over a 2nd tier side Big Blue where they finished top of the league with 100 points. 17

Discography

Albums
With Bus Stop
1998: Ticket to Ride 
2000: Get It On 
2002: Bustin' Rhymes & Melodies

Singles

Others songs

See also
Ricardo Autobahn
Rikki & Daz
Barndance Boys
Uniting Nations

References

External links
Daz Sampson's official website
Daz Sampson MySpace site
DJ Daz UK MySpace site
Behind-the-scenes pictures from the 2006 Eurovision Song Contest with Daz

1974 births
Living people
Eurovision Song Contest entrants for the United Kingdom
Eurovision Song Contest entrants of 2006
English male singers
English hip hop musicians
English male rappers
English record producers
English songwriters
Eurodance musicians
Musicians from Greater Manchester
Music in the Metropolitan Borough of Stockport
People from Stockport
English people of Scottish descent
English football managers
British male songwriters